Edem Rjaïbi (born 5 April 1994) is a Tunisian footballer who plays as a midfielder.

Career
He played for CA Bizertin in the 2013 CAF Champions League qualifying rounds. In the 2013 CAF Confederation Cup group stage Rjaïbi scored on 20 July 2013 against Fath Union Sport. He also scored in the 2014 CAF Confederation Cup qualifying rounds on 2 March 2014 in a 1–0 victory against C.D. Huíla and on 30 March 2014 in a 2–1 victory against Warri Wolves F.C.

On 17 July 2022, Rjaïbi joined Saudi Second Division side Al-Sharq. He was released on 3 January 2023.

International career
In November 2013 Rjaïbi was for the first time named in the squad of the Tunisia national football team.

Honours
CA Bizertin
 Tunisian Cup: 2013

References

External links
 

1994 births
Living people
Tunisian footballers
CA Bizertin players
Espérance Sportive de Tunis players
US Ben Guerdane players
Al-Sharq Club players
Tunisian Ligue Professionnelle 1 players
Saudi Second Division players
2015 Africa U-23 Cup of Nations players
Tunisia under-23 international footballers
Association football forwards
Tunisia A' international footballers
2016 African Nations Championship players
Tunisian expatriate footballers
Expatriate footballers in Saudi Arabia
Tunisian expatriate sportspeople in Saudi Arabia